Ivaylo Petrov (born 23 January 1991) is a Bulgarian footballer who currently plays as an attacking midfielder for Nesebar.

External links

Bulgarian footballers
First Professional Football League (Bulgaria) players
1991 births
Living people
OFC Sliven 2000 players
PFC Svetkavitsa players
PFC Nesebar players
PFC Chernomorets Burgas players

Association football midfielders
Sportspeople from Sliven